Elections were held in the state of Western Australia on 19 February 1977 to elect all 55 members to the Legislative Assembly and 17 members to the 32-seat Legislative Council. The Liberal-National Country coalition government, led by Premier Sir Charles Court, won a second term in office against the Labor Party, led by Opposition Leader Colin Jamieson.

The election produced a decisive victory for the Coalition, attributed by some observers to its strong and organised campaign, the Premier's ability in dealing with the media and good economic times built on resource exports, as contrasted against the Labor Opposition's often unfocussed campaign dwelling on the government's perceived autocratic methods and those sections of the general population which were not benefitting from the good times.

Results

Legislative Assembly

|}

Notes:
 The National Country Party contested seven seats in the election. The previous high vote stemmed from its attempted merger with the Democratic Labor Party prior to the 1974 election, known as the "National Alliance", which contested 44 seats including many in the metropolitan area. The Alliance ceased to exist shortly after the 1974 election, and adopted a more traditional strategy in 1977.

Legislative Council

|}

Seats changing hands

 Members listed in italics did not recontest their seats.

Redistribution affected seats

Post-election pendulum

See also
 Members of the Western Australian Legislative Assembly, 1974–1977
 Members of the Western Australian Legislative Assembly, 1977–1980
 Candidates of the 1977 Western Australian state election

References

Elections in Western Australia
1977 elections in Australia
February 1977 events in Australia
1970s in Western Australia